Hellefisk Fjord is a fjord in Peary Land, northern Greenland. To the northeast, the fjord opens into the Wandel Sea of the Arctic Ocean.

This fjord is named after the Greenland halibut.

Geography
The Hellefisk Fjord opens in the NNE of Herluf Trolle Land to the east of Wyckoff Land, southwest of Cape Clarence Wyckoff, west of which there is a small bay with an island off Cape Henry Parish. Its mouth is located to the southeast of the mouth of G.B. Schley Fjord.  high Mount Clarence Wyckoff rises to the east of the eastern shore of the fjord.

See also
List of fjords of Greenland
Peary Land

References

External links
Greenschist facies metabasites from the Hellefiskefjord - G. B. Schley Fjord area, eastern Peary Land, North Greenland

Fjords of Greenland
Peary Land